Barrington Chester Williams (born 11 September 1955) is a male retired English sprinter and long jumper.

Athletics career
Williams represented his country at the 1988 Summer Olympics in the 100 metres instead of his preferred long jump because the schedule would force him to compete on a Sunday which was against his religious convictions. He represented England, at the 1990 Commonwealth Games in Auckland, New Zealand and four years later represented England, at the 1994 Commonwealth Games in Victoria, British Columbia, Canada.

International competitions

1No mark in the final

Personal bests
Outdoor
100 metres – 10.34 (+1.3 m/s, Birmingham 1988)
Long jump – 8.01 (-0.2 m/s, Birmingham 1989)
Indoor
60 metres – 6.65 (Vittel 1988)
200 metres – 21.95 (Birmingham 1998)
Long jump – 8.05 (Cosford 1989)

References

All-Athletics profile

1955 births
Living people
English male sprinters
English male long jumpers
British male sprinters
British male long jumpers
Olympic male sprinters
Olympic athletes of Great Britain
Athletes (track and field) at the 1988 Summer Olympics
Commonwealth Games competitors for England
Athletes (track and field) at the 1990 Commonwealth Games
Athletes (track and field) at the 1994 Commonwealth Games
English people of Jamaican descent